Marple is a town in the Metropolitan Borough of Stockport, Greater Manchester, England. In 2011, it had a population of 23,686.

Within the boundaries of the historic county of Cheshire, the town lies along the Peak Forest Canal which contains the Marple Lock Flight and Marple Aqueduct. The Roman Lakes, to the south-east of the town centre, attracts anglers and walkers. The town is served by two railway stations: Marple and Rose Hill Marple, providing access to the rail network in Greater Manchester and beyond. It is also close to the Middlewood Way, a shared use path following the former Macclesfield, Bollington and Marple Railway line south from Rose Hill to Macclesfield.

History

Etymology
The first reference to Marple in written history was to Merpel, believed to be derived from the Old English maere pill, meaning 'the stream at the boundary'.

Early history
Scientists estimate that the earliest residents of the area settled several millennia ago. There are clues to their existence around the Ludworth area where there are standing stones and tumuli. This was confirmed around 1998 when an archaeological dig in Mellor revealed many clues about the existence of Marple's earliest residents.

The area was predominantly within the Macclesfield Forest, and was omitted from the Domesday Book survey. The first mention of the area was in 1122 in a deed for the sale of land. In 1220 the land passed to the Vernon family where it remained for several generations.
The pre-Industrial Revolution inhabitants of the village mostly worked on small farms and others specialised in linen weaving and hatting. After 1790, Samuel Oldknow transformed much of this lifestyle, with the construction of lime kilns and mills as part of the Industrial Revolution. The population of the village began to rise, with the construction of terraces to house mill workers and the formation of a village centre filled with private businesses.

Samuel Oldknow also played a large role in the development of the town in addition to his mills; there is still a street named Oldknow Road in Marple today. He built workers' cottages and churches, introduced aspen trees to the area, and assisted in the constructions of the Macclesfield and Peak Forest Canals. Marple Aqueduct, which opened in 1800, carries the Peak Forest Canals over the River Goyt, was designed by Benjamin Outram, a pioneer in the building of canals and tramways. Seven men lost their lives during its construction. Samuel Oldknow died in 1828; his mill was destroyed by fire in 1892. These navigations accelerated Marple's growth, but eventually declined into disrepair when the railway arrived in 1865. They have since been restored for use by leisure narrowboats, now forming part of the Cheshire Ring.

Recent history

In the early 1900s the town prospered from the success of cotton in nearby Stockport and Manchester; the canals in the area served as a link with other industrial towns. In 1936, Marple Urban District, at the time part of Cheshire, annexed from Derbyshire the parish of Ludworth and Mellor. Marple grew as a residential suburb of Stockport after the arrival of frequent bus and rail services in the 1920s.

Geography
On a clear day it is possible to view the Beetham Tower in Manchester as well as the city centre, the Winter Hill TV transmitter and the surrounding counties of Cheshire, Derbyshire, Lancashire and West Yorkshire and the mountains of North Wales from the top of these hills.

Governance

In 1866 Marple became a civil parish in Cheshire and in 1894 the parish formed an urban district. In 1974 the urban district was abolished and its former area was transferred to Greater Manchester to form part of the Metropolitan Borough of Stockport.

Marple is represented on Stockport Borough Council in two three-member electoral wards called Marple North and Marple South by six councillors; four Liberal Democrats and two Conservatives. Stockport Borough Council has 63 councillors in 21 wards, of whom 26 are Liberal Democrats, 21 are Labour, 13 are Conservative, and 3 others, as of May 2015. For the United Kingdom Parliament, Marple is in the Hazel Grove constituency, which is represented by William Wragg, a Conservative, elected in 2015, gaining the seat from the Liberal Democrats.

Marple is twinned with the town Motril in the province of Granada in Spain.

Public services
Water is supplied to the area by United Utilities. The nearest NHS hospital is Stepping Hill in Stockport, which is run by the Stockport NHS Foundation Trust. Marple has a police station, served by Greater Manchester Police, close to the library and Memorial Park. It also has a fire station, run by Greater Manchester Fire and Rescue Service, located behind the Asda supermarket in the town centre.

Culture and community

Since 1932, Marple has had a cinema in a building designed in 1878 as a place of worship or refuge. The building was purchased in 1932 by the 'Marple Cinema Company' and became the Regent Cinema. It remains open as one of the few independent cinemas in the UK.

The town has two brass bands: the Marple Band and the Hawk Green (Marple) Band.

Film appearances
In 2008, Marple was used as the setting for the BBC drama Sunshine.

Marple featured in a 2010 BBC documentary on Dr Beeching which described the long-term effects of axing much of the UK railway network in the 1960s. The programme highlighted the transport issues and how getting a direct train from Marple to Stockport was now impossible and the road traffic made the journey one of the most difficult in the UK.

Landmarks

Marple is notable for its series of 16 canal locks, known as Marple Lock Flight, close to the village centre. The Peak Forest Canal skirts the village, north running alongside Marple Memorial Park and Brabyns Park until it reaches the Marple Aqueduct and on to Dukinfield Junction, and south towards Bugsworth Basin. Macclesfield Canal meets the Peak Forest Canal at Marple Junction, and heads towards Birmingham. The two canals form part of the Cheshire Ring canal system; the canals served as a vital link during the Industrial Revolution. Nowadays they provide an area of relaxation for walkers, anglers and boaters.

The Roman Lakes leisure complex, in the valley bottom close to Strines, is popular with walkers, anglers, nature lovers and horse riders. The area was named in the Victorian era as an attraction to tourists, not because it had links with the Romans (also true of Roman Bridge, a packhorse bridge over the Goyt). In the area closest to the river there was a mill built by Samuel Oldknow and destroyed by fire in 1892. In 2011, volunteers uncovered the wheelpit and entrance footings to the mill and are currently seeking funds to continue the exploration. The wheelpit, which when built was the largest in the world, is now viewable.

The Middlewood Way is a 10-mile walking and cycling path between Marple and Macclesfield, following the line of the former Macclesfield, Bollington and Marple Railway.

Marple Hall

Marple Hall was close to where Marple Hall School now stands. The remains of the hall can be explored, though very little remains. The hall was the ancestral home of the Bradshaws and passed to the Isherwoods. It was demolished in 1959 after it was offered to the council in 1954 by the writer Christopher Isherwood, who had inherited it. By this time the hall had been ransacked by vandals and looters. Much of the estate is now residential housing or the school. The old hall foundations can be seen on the corner of Marple Hall Drive. There is a plaque on a piece of stone, the only remaining lintel from the house. The shutters from its windows are restored and on display in Marple Library. The hall overlooked the River Goyt and it is still possible to walk from there to the river following a pathway which once led to the Dooley Lane entrance to the estate. Nearby Brabyn's Hall suffered a similar fate. Wyberslegh Hall, now in private ownership, stood ruined for a time.

In a letter, Agatha Christie explained to a fan that while she was staying with a sister in Cheshire (her elder sister Margaret "Madge" had married Sir James Watt of Abney Hall) they went to a sale at Marple Hall. There Christie bought two Jacobean oak chairs which she still possessed at the time of writing and, wanting a name for her old-maid character in The Thirteen Problems, she thought of Jane Marple.

Transport
The town falls within the Greater Manchester Passenger Transport Executive area, with public transport provided by Transport for Greater Manchester (TfGM).

Railway

The town is served by two railway stations: Marple and Rose Hill Marple; both are on the Hope Valley Line. Marple station hosts regular services between Manchester Piccadilly, New Mills Central and Sheffield. Rose Hill was originally on the Macclesfield, Bollington and Marple Railway, which was closed in 1970, and is now at the end of a spur providing services to Manchester Piccadilly, via the Hyde loop.

The Agatha Christie character Miss Marple is often incorrectly thought to be named after the railway station, at which Christie was once delayed. Her grandson, Matthew Pritchard, cleared that up in July 2015 by bringing a letter to the station's 150th anniversary, which was, coincidentally, the 125th anniversary of the author's birth. The actual source of the name was Marple Hall, as discussed in the Marple Hall section above.

Buses

The town has many bus services, which are operated primarily by Stagecoach Manchester and High Peak. Key routes include:
 358: Stockport–Marple–New Mills–Hayfield
 375: Stockport–Stepping Hill Hospital–Marple–Hawk Green
 383: Stockport–Offerton–Marple–Romiley–Bredbury–Stockport circular
 384: the reverse route of the 383
 394: Glossop–Marple–Stepping Hill Hospital

Roads
The town lies along the A626, which runs between Glossop and Heaton Chapel. It has a junction in the centre of Marple with the B6101, which heads south to New Mills.

Education
Education in Marple is run by Stockport Metropolitan Borough Council.

There are two primary schools, the secondary Marple Hall School which occupies the site of the ancestral home of the Bradshaw-Isherwood family. Marple Sixth Form College (formerly Ridge Danyers College) offers courses to young people and adults. There is also an independent school and nursery, Brabyns Preparatory School.

Sport
Marple Rugby Club has three adult teams, and a "Marple Minis Rugby" outfit with teams from age 7 to 17.

Marple Cricket Club was formed in 1900 and has been based at Bowden Lane since 1951. The club is a member of the ECB Cheshire County Cricket League and its first team plays in the Premier Division. The club runs four senior teams: the first and second teams play on Saturdays and the third and fourth teams on Sundays. The club also has a junior section.
The cricket club built a squash section in the 1970s, which has three courts and four teams playing regular club squash.

Brabyns Tennis Club has four clay courts and three floodlit artificial grass courts, enabling year-round play. The club has several men's and ladies' teams in the Slazenger North East Cheshire League and mixed teams in the East Cheshire Winter League. There is a junior section and extensive coaching programme.

Marple Golf Club, founded in 1892, is in Hawk Green, Marple. It is an 18-hole private members' course.

Notable people

 Stephen Bradbury, artist and illustrator, grew up in Marple and attended Marple Hall School
 John Bradshaw (1602–59), president of the court that tried King Charles I
 Lieutenant Colonel John Stanhope Collings-Wells VC DSO (1880–1918), recipient of the Victoria Cross lived in Marple
 Edmund Cooper (1926–82), a poet and prolific writer of science fiction and detective novels
 Christopher Finney, recipient of the George Cross
 Jonathan Gledhill (1949–2021), ultimately Bishop of Lichfield, was curate at All Saints' Church in 1975–1978.
 Christopher Isherwood (1904–86), novelist, had his family home at Marple Hall, though he was born at nearby Wyberslegh Hall
 Timmy Mallett, TV presenter, grew up in Marple and attended Rose Hill Primary School
 Samuel Oldknow (1756–1830), the industrialist who created a huge textile empire and became Britain's leading manufacturer of muslin, moved to Marple after serving an apprenticeship in Nottingham. His lime kilns can still be seen in Marple.
 Edward Parrott (1863–1921), teacher and author, Member of Parliament for Edinburgh South
 Joyce Porter (1924–90), crime fiction author born in Marple.
 Matt Walker MBE, multiple paralympic medallist, attended Marple Hall School
 Tony Wilson (1950–2007), journalist and record label owner, moved to Marple at the age of 5 with his parents.
 Several musicians, including bands Delphic, Dutch Uncles and Egyptian Hip Hop, grew up in and around Marple

See also

 Listed buildings in Marple, Greater Manchester
 Marple Junction

References

External links

 The Marple Website

 
Towns in Greater Manchester
Towns and villages of the Peak District
Unparished areas in Greater Manchester
Geography of the Metropolitan Borough of Stockport